Dheepa Ramanujam is an Indian entrepreneur and actress who appears in Tamil films. Dheepa Ramanujam forayed into acting with K. Balachander's television serial Premi, while made her acting debut with a small role in the Rajinikanth-starrer Arunachalam (1997). She worked as an assistant director to Arun Vaidyanathan. She is popularly known for directing Chillu, a science fiction stage play produced by Sri Thenandal Films in collaboration with Shraddha and Krea, a US–based theatre group. She's also well known for her role as Bhuvaneshwari in the film Pichaikkaran directed by Sasi.

Since 2020 Dheepa has also become an entrepreneur and started her own line of denim jeans for Indian women under the brand name of Lotusline.

Filmography

References 

Living people
Actresses in Tamil cinema
Indian theatre directors
Indian women theatre directors
21st-century Indian actresses
20th-century Indian actresses
Year of birth missing (living people)
Actresses in Malayalam cinema